Anne Bochatay (born 1968) is a Swiss ski mountaineer and police officer in Andermatt. In the committee of the CAS Martigny section, she is responsible for the youth group.

Selected results 
 1994:
 1st, Patrouille de la Maya B-course, together with Madeleine Troillet and Nathalie Rieben
 1998:
 1st, Patrouille de la Maya A-course, together with Ingrid Farquet and Annelise Locher
 1999:
 1st, Swiss Championship
 2002:
 1st, Swiss Championship
 1st, Patrouille de la Maya A-course, together with Catherine Mabillard and Véronique Ançay
 3rd, Trophée des Gastlosen (together with Catherine Mabillard)
 8th, World Championship single race
 2003:
 1st, Swiss Championship
 1st, Trophée des Gastlosen, together with Catherine Mabillard
 2nd, Pierra Menta (together with Catherine Mabillard)
 2004:
 2nd, Trophée des Gastlosen, together with Catherine Mabillard
 2008:
 1st, Patrouille de la Maya A-course, together with Mary-Jérôme Vaudan and Véronique Ançay
 2009:
 2nd, Sky ski trophée (together with Catherine Mabillard)

Patrouille des Glaciers 

 2000: 5th, together with Martine Bellon and Annelyse Locher
 2008: 5th (and 1st in the "civilian women" ranking), together with Véronique Ançay and Mary-Jérôme Vaudan
 2010: 2nd ("military men 2" ranking), in a mixed team together with Carlo Kuonen and Guillaume Clavien

References 

1968 births
Living people
Swiss female ski mountaineers
Swiss police officers
Women police officers